George Ridsdale (born 1878) was an English professional footballer who played as a wing half. He played in the Football League for Burnley.

References

1878 births
Year of death unknown
Footballers from Blackburn
English footballers
Association football defenders
Burnley F.C. players
English Football League players